Grzegorz Hedwig (born 17 July 1988) is a Polish slalom canoeist who has competed at the international level since 2003.

Hedwig won three medals in the C1 team event at the European Championships (2 silvers and 1 bronze). He finished 12th in the C1 event at the 2016 Summer Olympics in Rio de Janeiro and 14th in the same event at the 2020 Summer Olympics in Tokyo.

References

External links 

 
 
 Grzegorz HEDWIG at CanoeSlalom.net

1988 births
Living people
Polish male canoeists
Canoeists at the 2016 Summer Olympics
Olympic canoeists of Poland
Sportspeople from Nowy Sącz
Canoeists at the 2020 Summer Olympics